This is a list of volleyball players that played in the Spikers' Turf. In early 2017, the league was merged with the women's league  (Shakey's V-League) and renamed as Premier Volleyball League.

Note: Names in BOLD are and have been team captains.Names in Italics are the players of the inaugural conference.

A 
  Abcede, Randean
  Abdul, Ahmad Fajani
  Abdulla, Awie
  Abdulmajid, Jaidal
  Abdulwahab, Al-Frazin
  Absin, Charles David
  Acojedo, Ray
  Adviento, Roniey
  Alfafara, Mark Gil
  Alinsunurin, Dante  Almandro, Andrei John  Almario, Carlo  Antonio, Christopher  Arbasto, Christian Anthony  Aringo, Leo  Asia, Geuel B 
  Bacolod, Ivan  Bagalay, Philip Michael  Baldos, Mark Jason  Baloaloa, Ariel Kenneth  Balse, Reny John  Banang, Jophius  Barilea, Ike Andrew  Barrica, Joshua  Barok, Andy Loyd  Batas, Kennedy  Bayking, John Kenneth  Bañaga, Anjo  Belostrino, Clarenz  Biliran, Kirk  Biting, Aladasir  Bonono, Edmar  Buddin, Michaelo  Bugaoan, John Paul C 
  Cabatingan, Carlo  Calderon, Aaron  Edward Camposano  Canlas, Eden  Canlas, Jason  Capate, Lorenzo Jr.  Casillan, Rolando  Castel, Bonjomar  Catipay, Warren  Cerilles, Reyvic  Christensen, Red  Coming, Berwin  Conde, Michael Ian D 
  Dacurong, Mimi  David, Juan Christopher  De Guzman, John Vic  De Ocampo,  Pitrus  De Pedro, Jim Ray  Dela Calzada, Karl Ian  Dela Cruz, Jay  Depamaylo, John Ian  Depamaylo, Nikki  Diezmo, Glacy Ralph  Dizon, Lorenzo  Doliente, Manuel E 
  Espejo, Marck Jesus  Espiritu, Angelo  Esteban, Clarence F 
  Faytaren, Alexis  Franco, Kheeno  Fuentes, Reyson G 
  Galang, Ron Jay  Gatdula, Rudy  Gianan, Guarenio  Gomez, Richard H 
  Hamdan, Jukran  Honrade, Sylvester  Hu, Rhenze I 
  Ilano, Harby  Inaudito, Ruben  Intal, Rex Emmanuel J 
  Jimenez, Jeffrey K 
  Kalingking, Jack L 
  Labide, Benjaylo  Lansangan, Jeffrey  Laraya, Leonel Evan  Leang, James  Lee, Mark  Longavela, Gilbert  Lopez, Jessie  Luces, Emmanuel M 
  Macalma, John Angelo  Macasaet, Chris  Magsino, Kevin  Malabanan, Jeffrey  Malleon, Armando  Mangaring, Juvie Mark  Mangulabnan, Vincent Raphael  Marasigan, Ysrael Wilson  Masahud, Sahud  Merza, Jimson  Miranda, Leo  Mojica, Howard  Montero, Sandy Domenick  Mosuela, Raffy N 

 O 
  Oclima, Cj  Ordoñez, Renz  Oxciano, Jaymar P 
  Paglinawan, Jan Berlin  Pecaña, Henry James  Pirante, Warren  Pitogo, Ralph Joshua Q 

 R 
  Ramos, Erickson Joseph  Ramos, Jayson  Ramos, John Patrick  Raymundo, Evan  Refugia, Manolo  Reyes, Michael  Rojas, Patrick John S 
  Sala-an, Allan Jay  Santos, Brendon  Sioson, Julius T 
  Tajanlangit, Mamel  Tamayo, Areem  Tan, Jasper Rodney 	Taneo, Relan  Taneo, Rey Jr.  Tanjay, Patrick  Timbal, Salvador  Tolentino, Edwin  Torres, Angelo  Torres, Antonio  Torres, John Paul  Torres, Peter Den Mar

U 
  Uy, Jason

V 
  Villonson, Joel

W

X

Y 
  Ytorzaita, Neil Barry

Z 
  Zamora, Michael

References 

Spikers' Turf